The 2015 SWF Scottish Cup is the national cup competition in Scottish women's football. All teams in the Scottish Women's Football League and Premier League are eligible to enter.

Format
Teams are either drawn into the preliminary round or receive a bye, so that there are 20 matches to play in the first round. The 20 winners then are joined by the 12 Premier League teams in the second round.

Preliminary round
34 of 57 teams drawn into the preliminary round. 23 received a bye to the first round.

First round

Second round
The 12 Premier League teams enter the Cup in this round.

Third round
Seven Premier League teams remain. Played 9 August 2015.

Quarter-finals
Four Premier League teams remain, Cumbernauld play in the SWFL 1st Division (level 2), Motherwell, Kilmarnock and Rangers U-20s play in the SWFL 2nd division (3rd level in general). Played on 11 and 13 September.

Semi-finals
Only Premier League teams remain. Played on 11 October on neutral ground.

Finals
It is the fourth Scottish Cup final between City and Hibernian in the last ten years;  City won in 2011 and 2013, Hibernian in 2007. Played on 8 November 2015.

References

External links
 Scottish Women's Football

Scottish Women's Cup
2015 in Scottish women's football
2015 domestic association football cups